Pope John IX of Alexandria (Died 29 March 1327) was the 81st Pope of Alexandria and Patriarch of the See of St. Mark.

Year of birth missing
1327 deaths
14th-century Coptic Orthodox popes of Alexandria